Kertee, also known as Kertigarh, is a village in Tharparkar District, Sindh, Pakistan, located  south of Mithi city. It was known as Karli Nagar in Gujarati language. Apart from its historical background, Kertee is also famous for an ancient well, about which locals say, is 5000 years old. Stories mention that this well was constructed by the Pandavas during their exile of 14 years. There are also temples of some common deities like as Oghar Nath, Pir Pithora, Pir Bhavsingh, Mard Ali Shah, Mauji, Mataji and three other temples of Shiva and one temple of Krishna.

Geography

It is surrounded by many other villages, including Veeh and Choompni to the south, Bhakuo and Veri.

Education
Kertee has Government Boys Primary School and Government High School for boys and girls, also have separate Government Girls School Kertee for girls.

Agriculture 
The district in which Kertee is situated is susceptible to droughts, which adversely affect local farming.

See also
Sant Nenuram Ashram

References

Populated places in Tharparkar District